is a Japanese pop rock group from Ishigaki Island in the Yaeyama Islands of Okinawa Prefecture, Japan. Their sound contains many elements of traditional Okinawan music, and prominently features the sanshin.

History
They have been friends since elementary school. They also attended the same senior high school but upon graduation all intended to go their separate ways. One day, Eishō gathered the members together again and they began to focus on music. On December 5, 1988, they sang at a friend's wedding, calling themselves "Begin" for the first time. Soon they began to become famous.  they have released 22 singles, 24 albums and 8 DVDs.
Perhaps their most famous song is "Nada Sōsō", a collaboration between Begin and Ryōko Moriyama. Begin has had at least one song appear on the NHK program Minna no Uta. They are also the performers of the "Ichariba Ohana" and "Izayoi Yoi", the opening and first ending themes of the Disney-produced anime series Stitch!.

Selected songs
 "Blue Snow" (1990)

Discography

Singles

Albums

References

External links
 BEGIN Official Web Site
 Profile Page at Imperial Records

See also

 Music of Japan

Japanese pop rock music groups
Musical groups established in 1989
Musical groups from Okinawa Prefecture
Amuse Inc. artists